The BYU College of Nursing is one of the 16 colleges that make up Brigham Young University. It currently has more than 400 students.

It began as the BYU School of Nursing in the fall of 1952 offering a bachelor's degree in nursing.  Vivian Hansen was the first dean. At some point in the 1950s, it was changed from being designated a school to being designated a College.

In 1963 an associate degree in nursing was established under the auspices of BYU's College of Industrial and Technical Education.  The change occurred because some sectors of the academic nursing community felt that associate degree programs should not coexist with bachelor's degree programs. In 1973 the associate degree program was moved into the College of Nursing making transfer between the two programs easier.

By 1976 the program had shifted to only granting bachelor's degrees with the associate degrees phased out. In that year the college of nursing added a masters program in nursing.

Sources
 Ernest L. Wilkinson, ed., Brigham Young University: The First 100 Years (Provo: BYU Press, 1975) Vol. 2, p. 634-637; Vol. 3, p. 97-100.
 BYU College of Nursing website

References

External links

 

Educational institutions established in 1952
College of Nursing
Nursing schools in Utah
1952 establishments in Utah